The canton of Hénin-Beaumont-1 is an administrative division of the Pas-de-Calais department, in northern France. It was created at the French canton reorganisation which came into effect in March 2015. Its seat is in Hénin-Beaumont.

It consists of the following communes: 
Dourges 
Hénin-Beaumont (partly)
Montigny-en-Gohelle
Oignies

References

Cantons of Pas-de-Calais